Gino Charlvic Pandent Wilson (born ) is a Namibian rugby union player, currently playing with the Namibia national team and the  in the South African Currie Cup competition. He usually plays as a winger.

Rugby career

Wilson was born in Windhoek.

References

External links
 

1996 births
Living people
Namibia international rugby union players
Namibian rugby union players
Rugby union players from Windhoek
Rugby union wings